The Embassy of Syria in Paris is the diplomatic mission of the Syrian Arab Republic to France. It is located at 20 Rue Vaneau in the 7th arrondissement of Paris.

History
The Syrian Embassy has been located at its current location since 1980; previously it was located in a villa at 22 Boulevard Suchet, which now houses the Embassy of Monaco. This move, which had been planned for several years, was however precipitated by an attack on the embassy on January 29, 1980.

Its Ambassador, also Permanent Delegate of Syria to UNESCO, is Lamia Chakkour. She was declared, along with two other officials from the embassy, to be a persona non grata on May 29, 2012, following a decision by the French Foreign Ministry, motivated by the Houla massacre.

On November 17, 2012, the President of the Republic, François Hollande, announced that France would welcome in Paris an ambassador from the Syrian Opposition Coalition, the French-speaking diplomat Monzir Makhous.

References

Paris
Syria
France–Syria relations
Buildings and structures in the 7th arrondissement of Paris